Kuh Sefid (also Romanized as Kūh Sefīd) is a village in Qaryah ol Kheyr Rural District, in the Central District of Darab County, Fars Province, Iran. At the 2006 census, its population was 429, in 106 families.

References 

Populated places in Darab County